"Target for Three" was an American television play broadcast live on October 1, 1959, as part of the CBS television series, Playhouse 90.  It was the first episode of the fourth season of Playhouse 90 and the 118th episode overall.

Plot
Set in an unspecified South American country, the play follows three rebels who are assigned with the task of  assassinating their country's brutal dictator, Montez.

Production
John Houseman was the producer. Robert Stevens directed, and David Davidson wrote the screenplay.

The cast consisted of Ricardo Montalban as Vincente, George C. Scott as Juan, Pedro Armendariz as Montez the dictator, Marisa Pavan as Consuelo (the dictator's daughter), and Liliane Montevecchi as Estrella.

Reception
The production received a positive review from Jack Gould of The New York Times. Fred Danzig praised the acting of Montalban and Armendariz and opined that the production "misses the bull's eye but wins a cigar for coming close." The Associated Press television critic Cynthia Lowry also praised the cast's performances.

References

1959 American television episodes
1959 television plays
Playhouse 90 (season 4) episodes